Crouy-sur-Ourcq (literally Crouy on Ourcq) is a commune in the Seine-et-Marne department in the Île-de-France region in north-central France.

Demographics
Inhabitants of Crouy-sur-Ourcq are called Crouyciens.

Schools
The town has one preschool (école maternelle), one elementary school (école élémentaire), and the junior high school Collège le Champivert.

See also
Château du Houssoy
Communes of the Seine-et-Marne department

References

External links

Home page 
1999 Land Use, from IAURIF (Institute for Urban Planning and Development of the Paris-Île-de-France région) 
 

Communes of Seine-et-Marne